Slough and Eton Church of England Business and Enterprise College is a co-educational secondary academy in Chalvey, Slough, Berkshire for students aged 11–19, with a sixth form of around 83 students studying for A levels.

Since the May 2011 Ofsted report, the school has been described as "outstanding". (The previous report in 2008 described the school as "a good school with some outstanding aspects.")

Since opening, the school has operated in a series of wooden and temporary buildings. Most of the site was destroyed in a fire in 1973 and the school rebuilt over the next 20 years. A further rebuilding project was started in the summer of 2006 and was scheduled to be completed in October 2008 at a cost of £10 million. This includes a twenty four classroom teaching block, sports facilities, school hall, sixth form centre, science labs, students support centre, administration offices, restaurant and performing arts areas.

References

Secondary schools in Slough
Academies in Slough
Educational institutions established in 1940
Church of England secondary schools in the Diocese of Oxford
1940 establishments in England